Csaba Ferkó (born 7 July 1987) is a professional Hungarian footballer currently plays for Austrian club TSU Jeging

External links
 HLSZ 
 Csaba Ferkó at ÖFB

1987 births
Living people
Footballers from Budapest
Hungarian footballers
Hungarian expatriate footballers
Association football midfielders
III. Kerületi TUE footballers
Integrál-DAC footballers
Zalaegerszegi TE players
FC Tatabánya players
Rákosmenti KSK players
Vasas SC players
Budafoki LC footballers
Nemzeti Bajnokság I players
Nemzeti Bajnokság II players
Hungarian expatriate sportspeople in Austria
Expatriate footballers in Austria